Travelogue: Blues Traveler Classics is a compilation album by American rock band Blues Traveler, released in 2002. It is composed of the band's greatest hits from before they were dropped by A&M Records.

Track listing
All songs by John Popper except where noted.

 "But Anyway" (Chan Kinchla, John Popper) – 4:09
 "Gina" (Kinchla, Popper) – 4:03
 "Mulling It Over" (Kinchla, Popper) – 3:44
 "100 Years" – 3:43
 "Optimistic Thought" – 3:30
 "Sweet Pain" – 7:42
 "Mountain Cry" (Brendan Hill) – 9:08
 "Love & Greed" (Kinchla, Popper) – 4:15
 "Conquer Me" (Bob Sheehan, Popper) – 5:09
 "Run-Around" – 4:40
 "Regarding Steven" – 4:44
 "The Mountains Win Again" (Sheehan) – 5:05
 "Crash Burn" (Kinchla, Popper) – 2:59
 "Hook" – 4:50
 "Carolina Blues" (Kinchla, Popper) – 4:44
 "Canadian Rose" – 4:31
 "Just for Me" – 3:05

Personnel
John Popper – Vocals, harmonica, 12-string guitar, Irish whistle (on "Conquer Me")
Chan Kinchla – Guitar
Bobby Sheehan – Bass
Brendan Hill – Drums, percussion
Tad Kinchla – Bass on "Just for Me"
Ben Wilson – Keyboards on "Just for Me"
Gregg Allman – Hammond organ, vocals on "Mountain Cry"
Joan Osborne – Backing vocals on "100 Years"
Paul Shaffer – Keyboards/organ on "Conquer Me"
Warren Haynes – Slide guitar on "The Mountains Win Again"
Arnie Lawrence – Soprano saxophone on "100 Years"

References

2002 compilation albums
Blues Traveler albums
A&M Records compilation albums